Israel participated in the 1970 Asian Games held in Bangkok, Thailand from 9 December 20 December 1970. The Israeli delegation was led by Esther Roth who won all of Israel's six gold medals.

Medals

Athletics

Medal table

Men

Women

Basketball

Preliminary round - group A

Standings

Games

Championship

Standings

Games

Roster
Coach: Shimon Shelah
 Dan Barzily
 Tanhum Cohen-Mintz
 Hillel Gilboa
 Ronald Green
 Hanan Keren
 Ivan Leshinsky
 Itamar Marzel
 Gabi Neumark
 Mike Schwarz
 Haim Starkman
 Gabi Teichner
 Mark Turenshine

Shooting

Medal table

Results

Swimming

Medal table

Men

Women

References

Nations at the 1970 Asian Games
1970
Asian Games